Karl Bohm (born 24 August 1995) is a Swedish footballer who plays for Utsiktens BK as a winger.

Honours

Club
IFK Göteborg
 Svenska Cupen: 2014–15

References

External links
  (archive)
 
 Karl Bohm at Fotbolltransfers
 

1995 births
Living people
Swedish footballers
Sweden youth international footballers
Association football midfielders
IFK Göteborg players
BK Häcken players
GAIS players
Utsiktens BK players
Allsvenskan players
Superettan players
Ettan Fotboll players